Qatar-2 is a K-type main-sequence star about 595 light-years away. The star is much older than Sun, and has a concentration of heavy elements similar to solar abundance. The star features a numerous and long-lived starspots, and belongs to a peculiar variety of inflated K-dwarfs with strong magnetic activity inhibiting internal convection.

Planetary system
In 2011 a transiting superjovian planet Qatar-2 b  was detected.  The planet has a large measured temperature difference between dayside (1368 K) and nightside (724 K). The planetary orbit is well aligned with the equatorial plane of the star, misalignment angle equal to 4.3◦. No orbital decay was detected. The color of planetary atmosphere is blue due to Rayleigh scattering of light, and albedo is very low, being below 0.06.

An additional massive companion on wide orbit was suspected in 2011, but search utilizing transit-timing variation method has yielded zero results in 2017.

References

Virgo (constellation)
K-type main-sequence stars
Planetary systems with one confirmed planet
Planetary transit variables
J13503740-0648145